Eva García may refer to:

 Eva García Fabre (born 1953), Ecuadorian diplomat and politician
 Eva García Pastor (born 1976), Andorran politician
 Eva García Sempere (born 1976), Spanish politician